Leandro Miguel Pereira Borges (born 29 April 1992) is a Portuguese footballer who plays for LigaPro club C.D. Trofense as a forward.

References
  
 

1992 births
Living people
People from Sintra
Portuguese footballers
Association football forwards
G.D. Estoril Praia players
C.D. Trofense players
Atlético Clube de Portugal players
C.D. Feirense players
S.C. Freamunde players
S.C. Olhanense players
AD Fafe players
C.D. Mafra players
F.C. Vizela players
Liga Portugal 2 players
Sportspeople from Lisbon District